The  Philadelphia Soul season was the thirteenth season for the franchise in the Arena Football League. The Soul played at the Wells Fargo Center.  The team finished tied for second at the end of the regular season but was seeded third in the playoffs due to the AFL tiebreak procedure. They then lost both games in their aggregate score semi-final series against the Baltimore Brigade.

Standings

Staff

Roster

Schedule

Regular season
The 2018 regular season schedule was released on February 13, 2018.

Playoffs

References

Philadelphia Soul
Philadelphia Soul seasons
2018 in Philadelphia
2018 in sports in Pennsylvania